The men's 800 metres event at the 2015 European Athletics U23 Championships was held in Tallinn, Estonia, at Kadriorg Stadium on 10, 11 and 12 July.

Medalists

Results

Final
12 July

Semifinals
11 July

Semifinal 1

Semifinal 2

Heats
10 July

Heat 1

Heat 2

Heat 3

Heat 4

Participation
According to an unofficial count, 30 athletes from 18 countries participated in the event.

References

800 metres
800 metres at the European Athletics U23 Championships